Lugus, officially the Municipality of Lugus (Tausūg: Kawman sin Lugus), is a 5th class municipality in the province of Sulu, Philippines. According to the 2020 census, it has a population of 29,043 people.

Geography

Barangays
Lugus is politically subdivided into 17 barangays.

Climate

Demographics

Economy

References

External links

Lugus Profile at PhilAtlas.com
Lugus Profile at the DTI Cities and Municipalities Competitive Index
Philippine Census Information
Local Governance Performance Management System

Municipalities of Sulu
Island municipalities in the Philippines